The United States national wheelchair rugby league team represents the United States in wheelchair rugby league. The team, nicknamed the Hawks, is controlled by USA Rugby League, the governing body for rugby league in the United States. Formed in 2022, the team made its debut at the 2021 Wheelchair Rugby League World Cup finishing third in their group with one victory and two defeats.

In 2019 the organizers of the 2021 Wheelchair Rugby League World Cup announced the United States as one of the countries invited to participate in the tournament. At the time of the invite there was no national team, so Australian Geoff Mason a former player was recruited to form a team.

2021 World Cup
Following try-outs a squad of 11 domestically based players was chosen and flew to England for the Cup. The squad was captained by Jeff Townsend who had previously played wheelchair basketball and included just one non-disabled player, Micah Johnson. In England the squad was joined by Matthew Wooloff, a player based in the United Kingdom.

The team's first ever competitive match was against Scotland in Sheffield on November 4 with the US winning 62–41 with Mackenzie Johnson being named player of the match.

The second group match was against Wales with the US defeated 32–50 in a hard fought game. The defeat left the US team with a chance of qualifying for the semi-finals but it would require Wales lose their last group game against Scotland while the US team would have to be defending world champions and number 1 seeds, France.  

The game against France was a one-sided affair as France ran in 21 tries to win 116–6 with Mackenzie Johnson scoring the only try for the US. Mackenzie Johnson was named in the RLWC2021 Wheelchair Team of the Tournament.

References

National sports teams of the United States
National wheelchair rugby league teams
2022 establishments in the United States